Sherburn or Sherburn Village it is a village and former civil parish in County Durham, England. It is 4 miles east of Durham.

The village is located in the Sherburn division of Durham County Council and the City of Durham constituency for Westminster elections. The population of this division taken at the 2011 census was 9,108.

History
A settlement has existed in this location for some considerable time. Until the 19th century Sherburn was a farming village, but with the Industrial Revolution came the sinking of mines to provide coal to fuel the industries and railways to ensure its distribution. By the 1930s the two pits that were within the Parish boundaries were closed and with the demise of neighbouring collieries in the 1960s the railway lines also became redundant.

In recent years Sherburn Village has become a popular place in which to live, surrounded by countryside and with transport links to the City of Durham, Newcastle upon Tyne, Sunderland and Teesside

Former Sunderland AFC, Peterborough United and West Bromwich Albion Centre-half John Wile was born in Sherburn

References

External links

 Durham Mining Museum entry on Sherburn Colliery

Villages in County Durham